Rogelio Armenteros Peña (born June 30, 1994) is a Cuban professional baseball pitcher who is a free agent. In 2014 he signed with the Houston Astros as an international free agent. He made his Major League Baseball (MLB) debut for Houston in 2019.

Career

Houston Astros
Armenteros played for Industriales of the Cuban National Series in 2011/2012. In September 2014, he signed with the Houston Astros as an international free agent.

Armenteros made his professional debut 2015 with the Tri-City ValleyCats and was later promoted to the Quad Cities River Bandits; in 61 total innings pitched between both teams, he posted a 3–2 record and 3.69 ERA. In 2016, he pitched for Quad Cities, Lancaster JetHawks and Corpus Christi Hooks, pitching to a combined 8–6 record and 3.53 ERA in 26 games (22 starts). After the season he pitched in the Arizona Fall League. Armenteros started 2017 with Corpus Christi, and after going 2–3 with a 1.93 ERA in 14 games, was promoted to the Fresno Grizzlies, where he finished the season with an 8–1 record and 2.16 ERA in 24 total games (20 total starts) between both teams. In 2018, he returned to Fresno, going 8–1 with a 3.74 ERA in 22 games (21 starts).

The Astros added Armenteros to their 40-man roster after the 2018 season. He began 2019 with the Round Rock Express. He was promoted to the Major Leagues on June 14, 2019. On March 14, 2020, Armenteros underwent surgery to remove bone spurs from his right elbow. However, the injury persisted and as a result Armenteros spent the 2020 season on the injured list without making an appearance for the Astros.

Arizona Diamondbacks
On November 20, 2020, Armenteros was claimed off waivers by the Arizona Diamondbacks.

Washington Nationals
On December 7, 2020, Armenteros was claimed off waivers by the Washington Nationals. After struggling to a 5.83 ERA in 7 games for the Triple-A Rochester Red Wings, Armenteros was designated for assignment on June 15, 2021. He was outrighted on June 18. The Nationals released Armenteros from his minor league contract on August 30.

Diablos Rojos del México
On January 17, 2022, Armenteros signed with the Diablos Rojos del México of the Mexican League for the 2022 season.

Guerreros de Oaxaca
On May 10, 2022, Armenteros was traded to the Guerreros de Oaxaca of the Mexican League. He was released on May 22, 2022.

International career
Armenteros was selected to represent Spain at the 2023 World Baseball Classic qualification.

References

External links

1994 births
Living people
Baseball players from Havana
Cuban League players
Major League Baseball players from Cuba
Cuban expatriate baseball players in the United States
Major League Baseball pitchers
Houston Astros players
Industriales de La Habana players
Tri-City ValleyCats players
Quad Cities River Bandits players
Lancaster JetHawks players
Corpus Christi Hooks players
Glendale Desert Dogs players
Fresno Grizzlies players
Gigantes del Cibao players
Cuban expatriate baseball players in the Dominican Republic
Round Rock Express players
Rochester Red Wings players